The Arizona Democratic Party is the affiliate of the Democratic Party in the U.S. state of Arizona. Its headquarters are in Phoenix.

Along with its main rival, the Arizona Republican Party, it is one of two major parties in the state. As of 2023, the party controls the governorship, secretary of state, and attorney general offices, and three out of the state's nine U.S. House seats. Additionally, both of the state's U.S. Senators were elected as Democrats and caucus with the party.

Party organization
The Arizona Democratic Party is organized into three parts: the state committee, the executive committee, and the executive board.

State Committee
The state committee is composed of "the chairperson of each county committee of the Democratic Party of Arizona, plus one member of the county committee for every three members of the county committee elected pursuant to statute." The state committee meets biennially. A state committee member has four duties:

a) Canvass and campaign only on behalf of Democratic candidates.
b) Assist in registration programs and in turning out a maximum Democratic vote.
c) Support the permanent State Party organization as well as their County and District Party committees.
d) Encourage financial support of the State Democratic Party, their County Committees and their districts.

The state committee has many officers including: Chair, Secretary, Treasurer, First Vice-Chair (who is required to be a different gender and county residence than the chair), three Vice-Chairwomen, three Vice Chairmen, Educational Coordinator, and Affirmative Action Moderator.

Executive committee
The executive committee meets quarterly. The executive committee consists of, "the County Chairperson and the first and second County Vice-Chairpersons from each county; the State Committee-elected National Committeemen, the State Committee-elected National Committeewomen; three members-at-large from each Congressional District; the President or a representative of the President of the Young Democrats of Arizona; the President or representative of the President of the Arizona Federation of Democratic Women's Clubs; and the other State Officers as listed in Article III of these bylaws. The Chair of the State Committee shall serve as Chair of the Executive Committee". The executive committee has several duties. "The Executive Committee shall approve the budget and amendments to the budget, approve specific contracts extending beyond the Chair's term, act as the final board of arbitrators for State Committeepersons seeking reinstatement after removal, and perform such duties as assigned by the State Chair".

Executive Board
The executive board duties are assigned by the chair. It also, "acts on behalf of the state committee between State Committee meetings".  The executive board meets at least quarterly. Members of the executive board are, "State Chair, First Vice-Chair, Senior Vice-Chair, Vice-Chairwomen, Vice-Chairmen, Secretary, Treasurer, Educational Coordinator, and Affirmative Action Moderator, the State Committee-elected National Committeemen and the State Committee-elected National Committeewomen".

National role
The state committee selects candidates to become presidential electors. These candidates pledge to vote for the National Democratic Convention's presidential and vice presidential nominee.  Additionally, the chair and first vice-chair serve on Democratic National Committee.  The state committee also elects the national committee members which represent Arizona.  These members serve a term of four years and must have previously been an elected precinct committee person.  National committee members are to be as evenly split between male and female as possible.

Current elected officials

U.S. Senate
Democrats had controlled both of Arizona's seats in the U.S. Senate since 2020. Currently, a single seat is under their direct control:

United States House of Representatives
Out of the 9 seats Arizona is apportioned in the U.S. House of Representatives, 3 are held by Democrats:

Statewide Offices
Democrats control 4 of the 11 elected statewide executive offices:

State legislative leaders
 Senate Minority Leader: Raquel Terán
 Assistant Senate Minority Leader: Mitzi Epstein
 Senate Minority Whip: Rosanna Gabaldón
 House Minority Leader: Andrés Cano
 Assistant House Minority Leader: Lupe Contreras
 House Minority Whips: Marcelino Quiñonez and Melody Hernandez

State Senate
The Arizona Democratic Party is the minority party in the Arizona State Senate, holding 14 of the 30 seats. 
 LD-04: Christine Marsh
 LD-05: Lela Alston
 LD-06: Theresa Hatathlie
 LD-08: Juan Mendez 
 LD-09: Eva Burch
 LD-11: Catherine Miranda 
 LD-12: Mitzi Epstein
 LD-18: Priya Sundareshan
 LD-20: Sally Ann Gonzales
 LD-21: Rosanna Gabaldón
 LD-23: Brian Fernandez
 LD-24: Anna Hernandez
 LD-26: Raquel Terán

State House
The Arizona Democratic Party is the minority party in the Arizona State House of Representatives, holding 29 of the 60 seats.

Mayoral offices
Some of the state's major cities have Democratic mayors. As of 2021, Democrats control the mayor's offices in three of Arizona's ten largest cities and one median-sized city
 Phoenix: Kate Gallego
 Tucson: Regina Romero
 Tempe: Corey Woods
 Flagstaff: Becky Daggett

History
The Arizona Democratic Party has been functioning since territorial times. The citizens of the Arizona Territory were mostly Democrats as a reaction to the Republican governors appointed by Washington, D.C.  When drafting a state constitution in 1910, 41 Democrats were elected as delegates to the convention  The convention totaled 52 delegates.

In July 2020, the party's headquarters was destroyed by a fire that was declared to be an act of arson.

Past officers

State Chairs
 Vernon F. Vaughan (1923)
 A. A. Johns (1925)
 C. E. Addams (1931)
 Junious Gibbons (1937)
 E. C. Locklear (1945)
 Stephen W. Langmade (1948–50)
 J. N. Harber (1955)
 Joe F. Walton (1958)
 Samuel Pearson Goddard, Jr. (1960–62)
 Bill Minette (1991–1993)
 Steve Owens (1993–1995)
 Samuel G. Coppersmith (1995–1997)
 Mark Fleisher (1997–2001)
 Jim Pederson (2001–2005)
 Harry Mitchell (2005–2006)
 David Waid (2006–2007)
 Don Bivens (2007–2009)
 Paul Eckerstrom (2009)
 Don Bivens (2009–2011)
 Andrei Cherny (2011–2012)
 Bill Roe (2012–2015)
 Alexis Tameron Kinsey (2015–2017)
 Felecia Rotellini (2018–2021)
 Raquel Terán (2021–2023)
 Yolanda Bejarano (2023–)

Members of Democratic National Committee 1920–present
 W. L. Barnum 1920
 Mrs. B. J. McKinney 1920
 Isabella S. Greenway 1928–34
 Clarence Gunter 1929
 Wirt G. Bowman 1937
 Mrs. Samuel White 1937
 Della Tovrea Stuart 1940–56
 Sam H. Morris 1943–50
 R. B. Robbins 1947
 Mrs. Henry S. Larson 1963
 Frank S. Minarik 1963
 Lorraine W. Frank 1980–2000
 Jim Pederson 2001
 Martin Bacal 2004
 Janice Brunson 2004
 Carolyn Warner 2004
 Joe Rios 2004
 Alexis Tameron 2004
 Sue Tucker 2004
 Judy Kennedy 2008
 Fred DuVal 2008

Election results

Presidential

Gubernatorial

Former prominent Arizona Democrats

United States delegates
 John Goulder Campbell (1879–1881)
 Granville Henderson Oury (1881–1885)
 Marcus Aurelius Smith (1887–1895, 1897–1899, 1901–1903, 1905–1909)
 Hiram Sanford Stevens (1875–1879)
 John Frank Wilson (1899–1901, 1903–1905)

United States senators
 Marcus A. Smith (1912–1921)
 Henry F. Ashurst (1912–1941)
 Carl Hayden (1927–1969)
 Ernest McFarland (1941–1953)
 Dennis DeConcini (1977–1995)

United States representatives
 Carl Hayden (AZ-1) (1912–1927)
 Lewis W. Douglas (AZ-1) (1927–1933)
 Isabella Selmes Greenway (AZ-1) (1933–1937)
 John R. Murdock (AZ-1) (1937–1953)
 Richard F. Harless (AZ-2) (1943–1949)
 Harold A. Patten (AZ-2) (1949–1955)
 Mo Udall (AZ-2) (May 2, 1961 – May 4, 1991)
 Stewart Lee Udall (AZ-2) (January 3, 1955 – January 18, 1961)
 George Frederick Senner, Jr. (AZ-3) (1963–1967)
 Bob Stump (AZ-3) (1977–1983)
 James Francis McNulty, Jr. (AZ-5) (1983–1985)
 Samuel G. Coppersmith (AZ-1) (1993–1995)
 Karan English (AZ-6) (1993–1995)
 Harry Mitchell (AZ-5) (2007–2011)
 Gabby Giffords (AZ-2) (2007–2012)
 Ron Barber (AZ-2) (2012–2015)
 Ed Pastor (AZ-2) (1991–2003) (AZ-4) (2003-2013) (AZ-7) (2013–2015)
 Ann Kirkpatrick (AZ-1) (2009–2011) (2013–2017) (AZ-2) (2019-2023)

Territorial governors
 Conrad Meyer Zulick (1885–1889)
 Louis Cameron Hughes (1893–1896)
 Charles Morelle Bruce ((acting) 1896)

State governors
 George W. P. Hunt (1912–1919, 1923–1929, 1931–1933)
 Benjamin Baker Moeur (1933–1937)
 Rawghlie Clement Stanford (1937–1939)
 Robert Taylor Jones (1939–1941)
 Sidney Preston Osborn (1941–1948)
 Daniel Edward Garvey (1948–1951)
 Ernest William McFarland (1955–1959)
 Samuel Pearson Goddard, Jr. (1965–1967)
 Raul Hector Castro (1975–1977)
 Harvey Wesley Bolin (1977–1978)
 Bruce Babbitt (1978–1987)
 Rose Perica Mofford (1988–1991)
 Janet Napolitano (2003–2009)

See also

 Arizona Republican Party
 Arizona Libertarian Party
 Arizona Green Party
 Political party strength in Arizona

References

External links
 Arizona Democratic Party

 
Democratic Party
Democratic Party (United States) by state
Political parties in Arizona